The ARC Centre of Excellence in Population Ageing Research  (CEPAR) is a collaboration of leading researchers in population ageing. CEPAR is an Australian Research Council Centre of Excellence. It was established in 2011. It is based at the University of New South Wales, with further nodes at the Australian National University, Curtin University, University of Melbourne and University of Sydney. CEPAR was the first social science centre to receive Centre of Excellence funding.

History 
The centre was established in 2011, funded primarily by an initial seven-year grant from the Australian Research Council (ARC), with support from collaborating universities, partner organisations and the NSW government. CEPAR was the first social science centre to receive Centre of Excellence funding.

From 2011 to 2017 it focused on five research areas: Causes & Consequences of Demographic Change; Cognition & Decision Making; Resources in Retirement: Covers policy and practice in delivering resources in retirement; Ageing Well & Productively; Health & Aged Care and Ageing in Asia & its Impact on Australia.

CEPAR was successful in securing funding for an additional seven-year term from 2017 to 2023 to undertake a new research program.

Description
The Centre is based at the University of New South Wales, with further nodes at the Australian National University in Canberra, Curtin University in Perth, University of Melbourne and  University of Sydney.

, it was the only Centre of Excellence to be hosted by a Business School in Australia.

Current research program 
CEPAR’s multidisciplinary research aims to help governments, businesses, and consumers prepare for and make better decisions for an ageing world.

CEPAR's research program is assembled into four interconnected research streams which draw on expertise from actuarial science, demography, economics, epidemiology, psychology, and sociology:

 Macro-demographic dynamics & population ageing policy 
 Decision making, expectations and cognitive ageing
 Organisations and the mature workforce
 Sustainable well-being in later life

Collaborators 
CEPAR is a collaboration between academia, government and industry, involving five Australian universities: the University of New South Wales (headquarters), the Australian National University, Curtin University, the University of Melbourne and the University of Sydney. The centre also has close connections with industry leaders and government agencies.  CEPAR has ~180 researchers. 

Current collaborating partner organisations include the University of Manchester, the University of Pennsylvania, the Wharton School of the University of Pennsylvania, the Australian Government Departments of Social Services, Foreign Affairs and Trade, Health and Treasury, NSW Treasury, the Australian Human Rights Commission, Reserve Bank of Australia, Safe Work Australia, Willis Towers Watson, PwC, Medibank, National Australia Bank and The World Bank.

The CEPAR research program is led by 12 chief investigators and three partner investigators.

References

External links 

Research organisations in Australia
Ageing
Demographics of Australia